William Henry Vanderbilt III  (November 24, 1901April 14, 1981) was an American politician who served as Governor of Rhode Island from 1939 to 1941, and a member of the wealthy and socially prominent Vanderbilt family.

Early life
Vanderbilt was born in New York City on November 24, 1901. He was the son of Alfred Gwynne Vanderbilt and Ellen "Elsie" French. Vanderbilt's father was a great-grandson of Cornelius Vanderbilt, who founded the family fortune in railroads and shipping. William Vanderbilt's parents divorced in 1908, and through his father's second marriage he had two half-brothers, Alfred Gwynne Vanderbilt Jr., and George Washington Vanderbilt III.

Education
Vanderbilt was educated at St. George's School in Middletown, Rhode Island (Class of 1919) and the Evans School in Mesa, Arizona. He attended Princeton University but dropped out during his first year. In 1940, Vanderbilt received an honorary LL.D. from Bates College.

Career

First World War
Shortly before the United States declared war on Germany during the First World War, Vanderbilt dropped out of St. George's School upon his appointment as a midshipman in the U.S. Naval Coast Defense Reserve to rank from March 20, 1917. As he was only 15 at the time, he was one of the youngest Americans to have served in the war.

During his service in the Navy, Vanderbilt served on the torpedo test ship  from April 17 to May 31, 1917, the Naval Torpedo Station in Newport from June 1, 1917 to March 7, 1918, aide for information Second Naval District from March 7 to July 15, 1918, in Norfolk, Virginia from July 23 to September 16, 1918, New London, Connecticut from September 19 to November 14, 1918 and as a plank owner of the newly commissioned destroyer  from November 11, 1918 to August 30, 1919. While serving on the Evans, Vanderbilt went on a cruise to Europe from June to August 1919. He was discharged from the Navy shortly after the end of the cruise, having not yet reached his 18th birthday.

Inheritance
When he turned 21, the then legal age of majority, in 1922, Vanderbilt inherited a $5 million trust fund plus the 450 acre (1.8 km²) Oakland Farm in Portsmouth, Rhode Island, one of his father's estates that included a number of thoroughbred horses. He made the farm his permanent home until the end of the Second World War.

The Short Line
In 1925, Vanderbilt started a coach bus company, called The Short Line, carrying passengers between Newport and Providence. Within a few years he expanded the business to serve points throughout New England and New York. The Short Line was purchased by George Sage in 1955 and, in 1970, was renamed Bonanza Bus Lines. Bonanza eventually merged with the Coach USA bus line in 1998 and was sold to Peter Pan Bus Lines in 2003. The Short Line's original terminal building in Newport still stands and is located near the intersection of Spring and Touro streets.

As a state senator and successful business leader, Vanderbilt was also a champion of the Mount Hope Bridge which connects Aquidneck Island with the mainland on the road north to Providence, Rhode Island from Newport. He was named the Chairman of the Mount Hope Bridge Commission and gave the opening address at the bridge's dedication on October 24, 1929.

Political career
Vanderbilt was a member of the Republican Party. In 1928 he was a delegate to the Republican National Convention from Rhode Island and that year was elected to the Rhode Island State Senate. Vanderbilt served in the State Senate for six years (1929–1935) and then took time off to be with his ailing wife, Anne Gordon Colby. On her recovery, he re-entered political life and successfully ran for Governor of Rhode Island in 1938. He served one two-year term from January 1939 to January 1941. His refusal to dole out patronage to fellow Republicans, however, weakened his power base, and a scandal over wire-tapping by a private detective firm he had hired to investigate election fraud, cost him re-election in 1940.

Navy service during World War II
In May 1941 Vanderbilt, an officer in the Naval Reserve, was called to active duty in June 1941 with the rank of lieutenant commander and initially assigned to the Panama Canal Zone. He was promoted to commander on August 15, 1942. In 1942 Vanderbilt was assigned as executive officer of the Special Operations Branch of the Office of Strategic Services (OSS) under General William J. Donovan. In May 1944 he was assigned to the staff of Admiral Chester W. Nimitz, commander in chief of the Pacific Fleet, in Pearl Harbor, Hawaii. He was promoted to the rank of captain prior to the end of the war.

Later life
After his discharge from the Navy at the end of the war, Vanderbilt left Rhode Island and retired to a farm in South Williamstown, Massachusetts. Oakland Farm and its 150 acres in Portsmouth, Rhode Island was sold and divided into housing lots by the end of the 1940s.

Vanderbilt died of cancer on April 14, 1981, at the age of 79. He was buried in the Southlawn Cemetery in Williamstown, Massachusetts. He is one of the few descendants of William Henry Vanderbilt not to be buried in the family tomb on Staten Island.

Personal life

Vanderbilt married Emily O'Neill Davies (1903–1935), granddaughter of Daniel O'Neill, owner of the Pittsburgh Dispatch newspaper, and daughter of Frederick Martin Davies on November 1, 1923 at Grace Church, New York. Emily was the grandniece of Frederick Townsend Martin, a prominent writer of the 1920s. The couple gave birth to a daughter:

 Emily "Paddy" Vanderbilt (b. 1925), who married Jeptha Wade, both graduates of MIT.

The couple's marriage was troubled and Emily sued for divorce in Paris in the summer of 1926, but reconciled. She again sued for divorce in Newport, Rhode Island which was granted in June 1928. She later married Sigourney Thayer (1896–1944), for less than a year, and then Raoul Whitfield (1896–1945), shortly before her death in 1935.

On December 27, 1929, Vanderbilt married for the second time to Anne Gordon Colby (1909–1974) of West Orange, New Jersey. Together, they had three children:

 Anne Vanderbilt (d. 2014), who was married Samuel Adams Hartwell, Sr.
 Elsie Vanderbilt, who married Andre Walter George Newburg (1928–2018) in 1954 and M. Bernard Aidinoff (1929–2016) in 1996.
 William H. Vanderbilt IV (b. 1945)

This marriage also ended in divorce in 1969 after 40 years of marriage, and Vanderbilt promptly re-married the following year to Helen Cummings Cook (d. 1997), who was previously married to John R. Cook, founder of Warren Cable Co., who survived him in death.

Awards
For his service in the Navy, Vanderbilt was entitled to the following medals:
World War I Victory Medal
Naval Reserve Medal
American Defense Service Medal with "BASE" clasp
American Campaign Medal
Asiatic-Pacific Campaign Medal
World War II Victory Medal

References

|-

|-

1901 births
1981 deaths
20th-century American politicians
American people of Dutch descent
Philanthropists from New York (state)
Bates College alumni
Burials in Massachusetts
Deaths from cancer in Massachusetts
Republican Party governors of Rhode Island
Politicians from New York City
St. George's School (Rhode Island) alumni
William Henry III
20th-century American philanthropists
Burials at the Vanderbilt Family Cemetery and Mausoleum